The Popular Councils was a centre-left political party in the Republic of Central Lithuania. Following the 1922 general elections, it holt 34 seats in the Sejm of Central Lithuania, being the second most popular party. After the Peasant Group of Popular Councils broke away from the party, its number of seats dropped to 27. Its ideology was the moderate radicalism, and it supported the incorporation of Central Lithuania into Poland. Its leader was Józef Małowieski.

Citations

Notes

References 

Political parties in the Republic of Central Lithuania
Political parties disestablished in 1922
Centre-left parties in Europe
Radical parties